Arthur Atherley (12 June 1772 – 1 October 1844) was an English Member of Parliament, serving the Southampton constituency three times, as Whig (a Liberal Party predecessor) and Reformer.

Atherley was born in Southampton, the son of Arthur Atherley and Susanna Carter, and was the fifth successive member of the Atherley family to be baptised as "Arthur". He was educated at Eton College where, in 1791, he had his portrait painted by Sir Thomas Lawrence (it now hangs in the Los Angeles County Museum of Art). At Eton, he was captain of the Ad Montem club, an institution with roots in medieval times that survived until 1847. One of the club's traditions was to take part in a procession to Salt Hill during which boys in fancy costume, the salt bearers, participated in the maintenance of their "captain" at university by levying contributions from passers-by.

After finishing his education at Eton, he went up to Trinity College, Cambridge, where he was admitted a pensioner on 6 May 1790, matriculating at Michaelmas, 1791, following which he was admitted to Lincoln's Inn. On 2 June 1793, he married Lady Louisa Kerr, daughter of William Kerr, 5th Marquess of Lothian; they had eight children.

Atherley was four times elected to represent Southampton as  M.P.; in 1806, 1812, 1831 and 1832, and was one of the original members of the Fox Club. He was also a member of the family banking business in Southampton. He retired from politics in 1835.

He later moved to Sussex, where he served as a justice of the peace. He died at Tower House, Brighton in 1844, but was buried in All Saints' Church, Southampton.

References

External links 
 
Descendant Chart for Arthur Atherley

1772 births
1844 deaths
Members of the Parliament of the United Kingdom for Southampton
Alumni of Trinity College, Cambridge
UK MPs 1806–1807
UK MPs 1812–1818
UK MPs 1831–1832
UK MPs 1832–1835
Members of Lincoln's Inn
Whig (British political party) MPs for English constituencies
People educated at Eton College
English barristers